Marin Barleti (– ) was a historian and Catholic priest from Shkodër who was a humanist. He is considered the first Albanian historian because of his 1504 eyewitness account of the 1478 siege of Shkodra. Barleti is better known for his second work, a biography on Skanderbeg, translated into many languages in the 16th to the 20th centuries.

Life
Barleti was born and raised in Scutari (modern Shkodra, Albania), then part of the Republic of Venice. Although there is no debate whether Barleti was a native Shkodran or an Albanian in a geographical sense, scholars variously assert that he was of Italian (DuCange, Iorga), Dalmatian (Giovio, Czwittinger, Fabricius), or Albanian (Zeno, Fallmerayer, Jireček) ethnic origin. In his works Barleti repeatedly calls himself Shkodran, and then equates being Shkodran with being Epirote, a term used by early Albanian language authors as an equivalent form of the ethnonym "Albanian". In an early version of the Siege of Shkodra which was found in 2018 and published in 2022, Barleti recalls that the local language which in another part he equates with Albanian is the language of his ancestors (attavorum nostrum). This is an indirect reference to Albanian being Barleti's mother tongue.

In 1474, the Ottoman Empire besieged Shkodra and Barleti participated in the successful defense of the town, both in the first siege in 1474 and the second in 1478. When Shkodra finally fell to the Ottomans in 1479, Barleti escaped to Italy where he would become a scholar of history, classical literature and the Latin language.

Soon after Barleti arrived in Venice, he was given a stall at the Rialto meat market as a temporary means of financial aid. In 1494 became a priest after his theological studies in Venice and Padova, and soon was appointed to serve at St. Stephen's Church in Piovene.

Works

The Siege of Shkodra 
Barleti's first work was The Siege of Shkodra (Venice, 1504). It was published several times in Latin and translated into Italian, Polish, French, Albanian, and English. Barleti wrote this work as an eyewitness. Of this work, acclaimed Albanian author Ismail Kadare wrote that "if one were to search for a literary creation wholly worthy of the expression 'monumental work,' it would be hard to find a better example than The Siege of Shkodra." An early version of the final work was found in 2018 and published in 2022.

The History of Scanderbeg 
Barleti's second and largest work was The history of the life and deeds of Scanderbeg, the Prince of Epirus, was published in 1504 in Venice, and later in Rome between 1508 and 1510; (2nd ed.: Strasbourg, 1537; 3rd ed.: Frankfurt am Main, 1578; 4th ed.: Zagreb, 1743) and translated into German (1533), Italian (1554), Portuguese (1567), Polish (1569), French (1576), Spanish (1588), and English (1596). Unlike The Siege of Shkodra, Barleti relied on the testimonies of others to produce this work. Barleti's books were published and printed by Bernardino Vitali in Venice and Rome.

The History of Scanderbeg is considered an Albanian cultural treasure, vital to the formation of Albanian national self-consciousness. A traduction of this work of Barleti is in slavonic, in the Cetinje chronicle. A note at the end of this manuscript says, according to Martinovic (1962) that the author of the text is "Marin from Shkodër of Slavic origin".

Paolo Giovio was the first historian to confound Barletius with another contemporary Marinus Scodrensis, Marino Becichemi (1468-1526), professor of rhetorics and author of commentaries on classic literature. The confusion has been elucidated by Thomas Reinesius and Apostolo Zeno. While Barletius in his works calls himself "sacerdotis Scodrensis" (priest of Scodra), Becichemi professes himself married and a "father of boys", professor of Ragusa, Brescia, and Padua, neither of which applies to Barletius.

A Brief History of Lives of Popes and Emperors (disputed) 
Barleti's third work is titled, A Brief History of Lives of Popes and Emperors (Venice, 1555).

Criticism
Barletius' work has inspired chroniclers like Giammaria Biemmi and Theodore Spandounes. It is still popular among romanticist and nationalist historians. Modern historical research on Skenderbeg relies more on archival records than on Barletius.

Barleti invented spurious correspondence between Vladislav II of Wallachia and Skanderbeg, wrongly assigning it to the year 1443 instead to the year of 1444. Barleti also invented correspondence between Scanderbeg and Sultan Mehmed II to match his interpretations of events.

Memorials
The main public library of Shkodra and a publishing house have been named after Marin Barleti. Also, a university in Tirana, Albania has been established under his name.

See also
Albanian literature
Culture of Albania
Bernardino Vitali
Siege of Shkodra

References

Sources

External links
Historia de vita et gestis Scanderbegi Epirotarum Principis Treasure of the National Library of Albania displayed by The European Library
 Historia de vita et gestis Scanderbegi Epirotarum Principis Online digital version presented at World Digital Library

1450s births
1510s deaths
16th-century Albanian historians
People from Shkodër
15th-century Albanian Roman Catholic priests
16th-century Albanian Roman Catholic priests
Venetian Albanians
Albanian humanists